Azim-ud-Daula (1775 – 2 August 1819) was the Nawab of Carnatic from 1801 to 1819. He was the eldest son of Amir ul-Umara and nephew of Umdat ul-Umara.

Treaty of 1801 

He ascended the throne upon his uncle's death in 1801.

As soon as Azim-ud-Daula ascended the throne, he was compelled to sign a Carnatic Treaty handing over the civil and municipal administration of the Carnatic to the British East India Company.

Azim-ud-Daula was, therefore, reduced to the position of a mere titular ruler.

In return, Azim-ud-Daula was entitled to one-fifth of the total revenue of the state and the honour of a 21-gun salute.

A portrait of Azim-ud-Daula by Thomas Day hangs in the Museum at Fort George, Chennai.

References 
 

1775 births
1819 deaths
19th-century Indian Muslims
Nawabs of the Carnatic